Willie Preston is an American politician and activist serving as a member of the Illinois Senate for the 16th district. Elected in November 2022, he assumed office on January 11, 2023.

Career 
Prior to entering politics, Preston worked as a union carpenter. He later worked as an organizer for Southsiders Organized for Unity and Liberation (SOUL). Preston was an unsuccessful candidate for the Illinois House of Representatives in 2018 and was elected to the Illinois Senate in November 2022.

References 

Living people
Illinois state senators
Illinois Democrats
Politicians from Chicago
Activists from Chicago
Activists from Illinois
American carpenters
Year of birth missing (living people)